Emilija Jakšić-Nikezić (29 April 1924 – 29 November 1949) was a Serbian communist. She participated in the National Liberation Struggle and was a socially-political worker of People's Republic of Serbia.

Early life
Emilija Jakšić was born in Belgrade, on April 29, 1924. She was a member of the youth revolutionary movement as a high school student. She joined the Union of Communist Youth of Yugoslavia (Communist Youth – SKOJ) in 1940. In August 1941, she joined in the National Liberation Movement (NOP).

As a youth leader, Jakšić organized and implemented actions such as diversion and sabotage. She was arrested in the winter of 1941 but escaped.

In January 1942, at age 17, Jakšić became a member of the Communist Party of Yugoslavia (KPJ). She served as acting Secretary of the District Committee of the Communist Youth and, a member of the District Committee of the Communist Party of Yugoslavia in Zemun. In October 1943, the Provincial Committee of the CPY for Serbia sent her to work in Šumadija to act as an instructor for the Provincial Committee of the Communist Youth.

In 1944, she became a member of the Provincial Committee of Communist Youth League of Serbia. After liberation, she served in various capacities in the Communist Youth and the CPY.

Career 
She married Marko Nikezić, a former organizing secretary of the CPY's District Committee in Belgrade, before becoming President of the Presidium of the Central Committee of League of Communists of Serbia. He was fired in 1972.

Jakšić became the holder of the Commemorative Medal of the Partisans of 1941 among other Yugoslav decorations.

Legacy 
She died in a car accident near Obrenovac on the 29th of November, 1949, at 25 years old. A street in the Belgrade suburb Nova Galenika was named Zemun in her honor.

References 

1924 births
1949 deaths
Serbian communists
Women in the Yugoslav Partisans
Yugoslav Partisans members
Women in World War II
20th-century Serbian women
Politicians from Belgrade